The Ducati 750 GT was a motorcycle made by Ducati from 1971 to 1974. Additionally there were 40 1978 750GTs manufactured. Total production of the 750GT over all years of manufacture was 4,133. Designed by Fabio Taglioni, the motorcycle was the first Ducati to have a 90° V-twin engine configuration, which became a signature feature in the Ducati bikes that followed.

References

External links

 Ducati 750 GT  at Ducati.com Heritage

750 GT
Standard motorcycles
Motorcycles introduced in 1971